Red Sorghum is a 2014 Chinese television series based on Nobel laureate Mo Yan's 1986 novel of the same name. Directed by Zheng Xiaolong, it also features the highly anticipated return of actress Zhou Xun to television after 10 years. The series chronicles the struggles of the protagonist Jiu'er (played by Zhou) in rural Shandong province in early 1930s. It aired simultaneously on four satellite television channels from 27 October to 17 November 2014 for 60 episodes.

Cast
Zhou Xun as Jiu'er / Dai Jiulian 
Zhu Yawen as Yu Zhan'ao
Huang Xuan as Zhang Junjie
Yu Rongguang as Zhu Haosan
Qin Hailu as Shu Xian
Matt William Knowles as AP Press Reporter

Production
To reproduce the scenes of the novel, the Gaomi local government planted more than 200 hectares of sorghum. The field, now known as "Red Sorghum TV Production Base", became a shooting site for the TV series. More than 500 local residents performed as extras in the TV show.

Reception
The series premiered to rave reviews online on Weibo and has enjoyed good ratings. It topped the ratings on four satellite TV channels for three weeks during its broadcast; and has been viewed more than 1.4 billion times on major streaming site iQiyi. According to Qilu Evening Post, the series also spawned viral greetings. Xinhua News Agency praised the drama, calling it a "classic in Chinese television history" and Hainan Daily called Zhou an "impeccable performer".

However, the series has been criticized the series as "too commercial" and "losing the touch of authenticity." The casting of Zhou in the role of the 19-year-old protagonist has also sparked a controversy.

Ratings 

 Highest ratings are marked in red, lowest ratings are marked in blue

Awards and nominations

International broadcast

References

External links

Television shows based on Chinese novels
2014 Chinese television series debuts
Television shows set in Shandong
Chinese period television series
Chinese war television series
Dragon Television original programming
Zhejiang Television original programming
Beijing Television original programming
Shandong Television original programming